"Don't Look Down" is a song by English pop duo Go West, released as a single in 1985. It reached No. 13 in the UK, No. 10 in Ireland, and No. 15 in New Zealand. The song was remixed later that year and released as a new single, under the title "Don't Look Down – The Sequel". Two years later, this version of the song was released to the American market and appeared on the American version of the band's Dancing on the Couch album. This single became their first top 40 hit in the States, reaching No. 39.

References

External links

Go West (band) songs
1985 singles
1987 singles
1985 songs
Songs written by Peter Cox (musician)
Chrysalis Records singles
Songs written by Richard Drummie